Linnich is a town in the district of Düren in the state of North Rhine-Westphalia, Germany. It is located on the River Rur (Roer river), approx. 10 km north-west of Jülich.

Economy
Linnich is the home of SIG Combibloc, the specialist for aseptic carton packaging.
On the same Industrial site Gascogne Laminates Germany is producing laminates packaging for the pharmaceutical industry.

Town twinnings
Since 1974, Linnich is twinned with the French town of Lesquin in the Nord département.

Transportation

Linnich has no direct connections to German Autobahns, but the exits Erkelenz-Süd of the BAB 46, Titz, Jülich-Koslar or Aldenhoven of the BAB 44 can be used.

Linnich is connected to the Rurtalbahn since 2002, and has one station near the SIG-factory and one in the suburb Tetz.

Culture and landmarks

Museums
 Deutsche Glasmalerei-Museum (German Stained glass Museum)
 Museum of Local History

Born in Linnich

 Wolfgang Dahmen (born 1949), mathematician
 Udo Recker (born 1967), medieval archaeologist
 Elke Winkens (born 1970), actress

References

External links

Düren (district)
Districts of the Rhine Province